Shanghai is one of the 40 subbarrios of Santurce, a barrio of San Juan, Puerto Rico.

Demographics
In 2000, Shanghai had a population of 11,331.

In 2010, Shanghai had a population of 9,438 and a population density of 34,955.6 persons per square mile.

Location
Shanghai is a crossover sector in Santurce located north and south of Baldorioty Expressway between Loiza Street (PR-37) and Gilberto Monroig Street. It is surrounded by Isla Verde, Las Marías, Los Corozos Lagoon, Merhoff, Villa Palmeras and Ocean Park Beach.

See also
 
 List of communities in Puerto Rico

References

Santurce, San Juan, Puerto Rico
Municipality of San Juan